Kateřina Siniaková was the defending champion, but chose to participate at the 2017 Internazionali BNL d'Italia instead.

Markéta Vondroušová won the title, defeating Verónica Cepede Royg in the final, 7–5, 7–6(7–3).

Seeds

Draw

Finals

Top half

Bottom half

References
Main Draw

Empire Slovak Open - Singles